Otto Township may refer to the following places :

In Canada
 Otto Township, Timiskaming District, Ontario

In the United States

 Otto Township, Kankakee County, Illinois
 Otto Township, Michigan
 Otto Township, Otter Tail County, Minnesota
 Otto Township, McKean County, Pennsylvania

	

Township name disambiguation pages